Savigny-en-Septaine is a commune in the Cher department in the Centre-Val de Loire region of France.

Geography
The village lies on the left bank of the river Airain, which flows north through the middle of the commune, then flows into the Yèvre, which forms part of the commune's northern boundary.

History 
During the summer 1944, in a farm of the village occurred the Tragedy of the Guerry's wells. It designates the massacre of 36 Jews by French militiamen.

Population

Sights
 The church of St. Etienne, dating from the thirteenth century.
 A watermill.

See also
Communes of the Cher department

References

External links

Old postcard photos of the commune 
Unofficial commune website 

Communes of Cher (department)